

Events 
April 16 Johann Sebastian Bach revives the anonymous St Luke Passion BWV 246 (BC D 6a) with an additional chorale by Bach himself at St. Nicholas Church, Leipzig.
Thomas Arne enlarges the orchestra at Vauxhall Gardens, taking on John Hebden as principal cellist and bassoonist.
Giovanni Battista Pescetti returns to Venice and becomes Second Organist at St Mark's Basilica.
After 1745 Bach performs the Passion cantata pastiche Wer ist der, so von Edom kömmt (BC D 10).

Classical music 
Carl Philipp Emanuel Bach 
Menuet con 5 Variazioni, Wq, 118, H.44
Harpsichord Concerto in E minor, H.418
Harpsichord Concerto in D minor, H.420
Harpsichord Concerto in D major, H.421
Trio Sonata in C major, H.573
Johann Sebastian Bach – Gloria in excelsis Deo, BWV 191
Wilhelm Friedemann Bach – Keyboard Sonata in D major, F.3
Johann Ernst Eberlin – 9 Toccatas and Fugues (for organ), published in Augsburg, 1747, as IX toccate e fughe
George Frideric Handel – Hercules, HWV 60 (oratorio)
 Johann Melchior Molter – Clarinet Concerto in G major, MWV 6.40
Johann Joachim Quantz – Flute Concerto in G major, QV 5:174
John Stanley – 10 Voluntaries (for organ), published in 1748 as Op. 5
Georg Philipp Telemann – Johannes Passion, TWV 5:30
Tomaso Antonio Vitali – Chaconne in G minor

Opera
Ferdinando Bertoni – La vedova accorta
François Francœur and François Rebel 
Le Trophée
Zélindor, roi des Sylphes
George Frideric Handel –  Comus (based on the masque by John Milton)
Gennaro Manna – Lucio Vero
Jean-Philippe Rameau 
Les Fêtes de Polymnie, RCT 39
Platée, RCT 53
Jean-Jacques Rousseau – Les Muses galantes
Georg Christoph Wagenseil – Ariodante

Publications
Louis-Antoine Dornel – Le tour du clavier sur tous les tons
John Stanley – Six Solo's for flute or violin and harpsichord, Op. 4 (London)
Giuseppe Tartini – 12 Violin Sonatas, Op. 2 (Rome: Antonius Cleton)

Methods and theory writings 

Bartolomé Ferriol – Reglas utiles para los aficionados a danzar
Georg Andreas Sorge – Vorgemach der musicalischen Composition

Births 
January 17 – Nicolas Roze, music collector and composer (died 1819)
January 18 – Caterino Mazzolà, librettist and poet (died 1806)
February – Johann Peter Salomon, violinist, conductor and composer (died 1815)
March 4 – Charles Dibdin, British composer (died 1814)
April 7 – Jiří Družecký, Czech composer (died 1819)
May 7 – Carl Stamitz, composer (died 1801)
July 15 – Friedrich Wilhelm Heinrich Benda, composer and musician (died 1814)
August 19 – Johann Ignaz Ludwig Fischer, operatic bass (died 1825)
November 9 – Johann Michael Bach, musician and theorist (died 1820)
December 9 – Maddalena Laura Sirmen, violinist, singer and composer (died 1818)
December 25 – Chevalier de Saint-Georges, the "Black Mozart" (died 1799)
date unknown – Sophia Baddeley, actress and singer (died 1786)

Deaths 
January – Giovanni Lorenzo Gregori, collector and composer (born 1663)
February 18 – Nicola Fago, composer and music teacher (born 1677)
March 15 – Michel de la Barre, flautist and composer (born c.1675)
April 18 – Francesco Venturini, composer and musician (born 1675)
April 27 – Jean-Baptiste Morin, composer (born 1677)
May 9 – Tomaso Antonio Vitali, violinist and composer (born 1663)
June 25 – Johann Wilhelm Drese, composer (born 1677)
June 28 – Antoine Forqueray, viola da gamba player and composer (born 1672)
September 5 – Simon-Joseph Pellegrin, librettist and poet (born 1663)
October 18 – Jacques Autreau, librettist and painter (born 1657)
October 19 – Jonathan Swift, librettist and satirist (born 1667)
October 24 – Antonio Veracini, violinist and composer (born 1659)
November 5 – Françoise-Charlotte de Senneterre Ménétou, French composer (born 1679)
December 6 – Christoph Förster, German composer (born 1693) 
December 23 – Jan Dismas Zelenka, composer (born 1679)
date unknown – Charles Coffey, dramatist and composer

 
18th century in music
Music by year